Charles Wood (15 June 1866 – 12 July 1926) was an Irish composer and teacher; his students included Ralph Vaughan Williams at Cambridge and Herbert Howells at the Royal College of Music. He is primarily remembered and performed as an Anglican church music composer, but he also wrote songs and chamber music, particularly for string quartet.

Career
Born in Vicars' Hill in the Cathedral precincts of Armagh, Ireland, Charles was the fifth child and third son of Charles Wood Sr. and Jemima Wood. The boy was a treble chorister in the choir of the nearby St. Patrick's Cathedral (Church of Ireland). His father sang tenor as a stipendiary 'Gentleman' or 'Lay Vicar Choral' in the Cathedral choir and was also the Diocesan Registrar of the church. He was a cousin of Irish composer Ina Boyle.

Wood received his early education at the Cathedral Choir School and also studied organ with two organists and masters of the Boys of Armagh Cathedral, Robert Turle and his successor Dr Thomas Marks. In 1883 he became one of fifty inaugural class members of the Royal College of Music, studying composition with Charles Villiers Stanford and Charles Hubert Hastings Parry primarily, and horn and piano secondarily. Following four years of training, he continued his studies at Selwyn College, Cambridge, through 1889, where he began teaching harmony and counterpoint. In 1889 he attained a teaching position at Gonville and Caius College, Cambridge, first as organ scholar and then as fellow in 1894, becoming their first director of music and organist. He was instrumental in the reflowering of music at the college, though more as a teacher and organiser of musical events than as composer. After Stanford died in 1924, Wood assumed his mentor's vacant role as Professor of Music at the University of Cambridge.

According to his successor at Cambridge, Edward J Dent, as a teacher of composition, Wood "was surpassed only by Stanford himself [and] as a teacher of counterpoint and fugue he was unequalled". His pupils at Cambridge included Ralph Vaughan Williams, Nicholas Gatty, Arthur Bliss, Cecil Armstrong Gibbs and W Denis Browne. Dent says that, because Stanford did not reside in Cambridge, Wood took on the real burden on teaching for many years before his own election as Professor of Music, by which time his health was already undermined. He died in July 1926 after only two years in the post.

Personal life
He married Charlotte Georgina Wills-Sandford, daughter of William Robert Wills-Sandford, of Castlerea, County Roscommon, Ireland, on 17 March 1898. They had two sons and three daughters, including Lieutenant Patrick Bryan Sandford Wood R.A.F. (1899-1918), who was killed in an aircraft accident during the First World War and is buried at Taranto, Italy. The family's address in Cambridge was 17, Cranmer Road. He is buried at the Parish of the Ascension Burial Ground in Cambridge, together with his wife. There is a memorial to him in the north aisle at St Patrick's Cathedral, Armagh.

Music
Like his better-known colleague Stanford, Wood is chiefly remembered for his Anglican church music. As well as his Communion Service in the Phrygian Mode, his settings of the Magnificat and Nunc dimittis are still popular with cathedral and parish church choirs, particularly the services in F, D, and G, and the two settings in E flat. During Passiontide his St Mark Passion, written in 1920 for Eric Milner-White, the then Dean of King’s College, Cambridge, is sometimes performed. It demonstrates Wood's interest in modal composition, in contrast to the late romantic harmonic style he more usually employs.

Wood's anthems with organ, Expectans expectavi, and O Thou, the Central Orb are both frequently performed and recorded; as are his unaccompanied anthems Tis the day of Resurrection, Glory and Honour and, most popular of all, Hail, gladdening light and its lesser-known equivalent for men's voices, Great Lord of Lords. All Wood's a cappella music demonstrates fastidious craftsmanship and a supreme mastery of the genre, and he is no less resourceful in his accompanied choral works which sometimes include unison sections and have stirring organ accompaniments, conveying a satisfying warmth and richness of emotional expression appropriate to his carefully chosen texts.

After the fashion of the time Wood composed a series of secular choral cantatas between 1885 and 1905, including On Time (1897-8, setting Milton), Dirge for Two Veterans (1901, setting Walt Whitman), and A Ballad of Dundee (1904, setting W.E. Aytoun). There were also madrigals (including If Love be Dead, setting Coleridge), part songs (such as Full Fathom Five) and solo songs, one of which, Ethiopia Saluting the Colours (setting Walt Whitman) attained high popularity.

Of the orchestral works, both the Piano Concerto (1886) and the Patrick Sarsfield Variations (1899) remained unpublished, although the Variations received a performance at the Queen's Hall Beecham Concerts in 1907. Walter Starkie said the work "shows his power of creating what may be called the Irish atmosphere in music". It has been revived in modern times by the Ulster Orchestra, conducted by Simon Joly. However, Wood appears to have lost confidence and abandoned the orchestral medium after 1905. Three symphonies and an opera remained uncompleted.

He also composed eight string quartets (six numbered, plus the Variations on an Irish Folk Tune and a first movement fragment in G minor), spanning 1885 to 1917. The early quartets show the influence of Brahms, but from No. 3 in A minor (1911) a more personal voice emerges, partly through the use of Irish folk melodies and dance tunes as thematic material. There is a modern recording of No. 3 by the Lindsay Quartet. The quartets were edited after the composer's death by Edward Dent and published in a collected edition by Oxford University Press in 1929.

Wood collaborated with priest and poet George Ratcliffe Woodward in the revival and popularisation of renaissance tunes to new English religious texts, notably co-editing three books of carols. He was co-founder (in 1904) of the Irish Folk Song Society.

List of works

Stage
 A Scene from Pickwick, chamber opera in 1 act (after Charles Dickens) (1921)
 The Family Party, chamber opera in 1 act (1923)
 several pieces of incidental music to plays

Orchestral
 Piano Concerto in F major (1886)
 Patrick Sarsfield. Symphonic Variations on an Irish Air (1899)
 several unfinished symphonic fragments

Chamber music

String quartets
 No. 1 in D minor (1885)
 No. 2 in E-flat major, "Highgate" (1892)
 No. 3 in A minor (1911/12?)
 No. 4 in E-flat major, "Harrogate" (1912)
 No. 5 in F major (1914/15?)
 No. 6 in D major (1915/16?)
 Variations on an Irish Folk Tune (c.1917)
 Quartet in G minor (fragment; c.1916/17)

Other
 Septet in C minor (1889) for clarinet, bassoon, horn, violin, viola, cello, bass
 Quintet in F major (1891) for flute, oboe, clarinet, horn, bassoon
 Sonata in A major (1890s) for violin & piano
 Two Pieces (Jig, Planxty) (1923) for violin & piano
 Two Irish Dances (1927) for violin & piano

Solo instruments

Organ
 Variations and Fugue on 'Winchester Old (1908)
 Three Preludes on Melodies from the Genevan Psalter (1908)
 Sixteen Preludes on Melodies from the English and Scottish Psalters (1912)
 Suite in the Ancient Style (1915?)

Piano 
 The Choristers' March 
 Four Characteristic Pieces in Canon, Op. 6 (1893)

Cantatas
 Spring's Summons (Alfred Perceval Graves) for soprano, tenor, baritone, mixed chorus and orchestra (1885)
 Ode to the West Wind, Op. 3 (P. B. Shelley) for tenor, mixed chorus and orchestra (1890)
 Music – An Ode (A. C. Swinburne) for soprano, mixed chorus and orchestra (1893)
 The White Island (Robert Herrick) for soprano, tenor, baritone, bass, mixed chorus and orchestra (1894)
 On Time (Milton) for mixed chorus and orchestra (1898)
 Dirge for two Veterans (Walt Whitman) for baritone, mixed chorus and orchestra (1901)
 The Song of the Tempest (Walter Scott) for soprano, mixed chorus and orchestra (1903)
 A Ballad of Dundee (W. E. Aytoun) for bass, mixed chorus and orchestra (1904)
 Eden Spirits (E. B. Browning) for female voices and piano (1915?)

Sacred works
 Magnificat and Nunc dimittis in D (1898)
 Magnificat and Nunc dimittis in c minor (1900)
 Oculi omnium (canonic) (1904)
 Magnificat and Nunc dimittis in F (1908)
 Glorious and Powerful God (1910)
 Magnificat and Nunc dimittis in G (1911)
 Hail, Gladdening Light (1912, pub. 1919)
 Glory and Honour and Laud (1912, pub. 1925)
 Father, All-Holy (1912, pub. 1929)
 O King Most High (1912, pub. 1932)
 Once He came in Blessing (1912, pub. 1935)
 Great Lord of Lords (1913)
 Magnificat and Nunc dimittis in E (1913)
 Magnificat and Nunc dimittis in G (1915)
 Magnificat and Nunc dimittis in A flat (1915)
 Magnificat and Nunc dimittis 'Collegium Regale in F (1915)
 O Thou, the Central Orb (1915, setting of an 1873 poem by H.R. Bramley)
 Magnificat and Nunc dimittis in E flat (1918)
 Expectans expectavi (1919) (setting Charles Hamilton Sorley)
 Haec dies (1919, pub. 1920)
 Magnificat and Nunc dimittis in E flat 'no. 2 (posthumous)
 St Mark Passion (1920)
 Communion Setting 'in the Phrygian Mode (1923)
 Magnificat and Nunc dimittis founded on an old Scotch chant (pub. 1926)
 Magnificat and Nunc dimittis in a minor (pub. 1926)
 O most merciful (pub.1927 with 'Oculi omnium')
 Oculi omnium (pub.1927 with 'O most merciful')
 Communion Service in c minor (pub. 1927)
 Magnificat and Nunc dimittis in C (pub. 1927)

Smaller secular vocal works
Madrigals
 If Love be Dead (S.T. Coleridge) for SSATB (1886)
 Slow, Slow Fresh Fount (Ben Johnson) for SSATB (1889)
 The Bag of the Bee (Robert Herrick) for SSATB (pub. 1929)

Part songsMixed voices
(Scoring SATB unless noted)
 How Sweet the Moonlight Sleeps for SSATB (1887/8?)
 Blow, Blow thou Winter Wind (1888?)
 The Hemlock Tree (1890/1?)
 Full Fathom Five (1890/1?)
 It was a Lover (1892/3?)
 Wanderer's Night Song (1892/3)
 The Widow Bird (1895/6?)
 A Land Dirge (1898?)
 The Countryman (1898?)
 A Century's Penultimate for SSATBB (1899)
 Nights of Music (1899?)
 As the Moon's Soft Splendour (1905?)
 The Whispering Waves (1905?)
 I Call and I Call for SSATB (1905?)
 How Sweet the Tuneful Bells (1906)
 Come Sleep (1908?)
 When Whispering Strains for SSATB (1908?)
 Fain Would I Change (1908?)
 Music, When Soft Voices Die (1908?)
 Haymakers, Rakers (1908?)
 Time (1914)
 Awake, Awake (1914?)
 Love, What Wilt Thou (1921?)
 Follow, Follow (1922?)
 Shepherd's Sunday Song (1923?)
 Spring song (1923?)
 Autumn (1924?)
 Wassail (1925?)
 Lullaby (pub. 1927)
 The Lamb (pub. 1927)
 Down in yon Summer Vale, original for male voices (pub. 1927)
 Hence Away, Begone (pub. 1929)
 The Solitary Reaper (pub. 1930)
 Rose-cheeked Laura (pub. 1931)
 When to her Lute (pub. 1933)
 Spring Time (pub. 1937)Male voices
 It was a Lover for ATTB (1892/3?)
 It was an English Ladye Bright for baritone solo and TTBB (1899)
 Down in yon Summer Vale for TTBB (1901?)
 There Comes a New Moon for ATTB (1907/8?)
 When Winds that Move Not for ATTB (1912/13?)
 The Russian Lover for TTBB (1921/2?)
 Paty O'Toole for TTBB (1922)
 There be None of Beauty's Daughters for ATTB (1926)
 A Clear Midnight for TTBB (pub. 1926)
 When thou art Nigh for TTBB (pub. 1927)
 Neptune's Empire for TBB (pub. 1927)
 Robin Hood for TBB (pub. 1927)
 Carmen Caianum for unison men (1891/2?)

Female voices
 The Nymph's Faun for SSAA (1908?)
 Echo for SSA and piano (1908/9?)
 Cowslips for her Covering for SSAA and piano (1912/13?)
 Good Precepts for SSA and piano (1912/13?)
 Music When Soft Voices Die for SSA and piano (1914/15?)
 Sunlight All Golden for SSSS and piano (1918)
 The Starlings for SSA (1918/19?)
 Lilies for SSA (1918/19?)
 Golden Slumbers for SSSS (1919/20?)
 To Music Bent for SSA and piano or two violins (1920/1?)
 To Welcome in the Year for SSA (1923/24?)
 The Blossom for SSA (pub. 1926)
 What is a Day for SSA and piano (pub. 1927.)

Solo songs
 Irish Folk Songs (Alfred Perceval Graves) (1897)
 Ethiopia Saluting the Colours (Walt Whitman) (1898)
 Irish County Songs (Alfred Perceval Graves), three vols. (1914, 1927, 1928)
 Anglo-Irish Folk Songs (Padraic Gregory) vol. I (pub. 1931)
 and many more, including Irish folksong arrangements

Bibliography
 Ian Copley: The Music of Charles Wood: A Critical Study (London: Thames Publishing, 1978), 
 Ian Copley: "Charles Wood, 1886–1926", in The Musical Times, vol. 107 (1966) no. 1480, pp. 489–492.
 "Charles Wood", in The Musical Times, vol. 67 (1926) no. 1002, pp. 696–697.
 Margaret Hayes Nosek: "Wood: A Personal Memoir", in The Musical Times, vol. 107 (1966) no. 1480, pp. 492–493.
 Royal School of Church Music (ed.): English Church Music (Croydon, UK: Royal School of Church Music, 1963).
 Nicholas Temperley (ed.): The Athlone History of Music in Britain, vol. 5: The Romantic Age, 1800–1914 (London: The Athlone Press, 1981).
 Geoffrey Webber: "An 'English' Passion", in The Musical Times, vol. 133, no. 1790 (April 1992), pp. 202–203.

References

External links

 
 
 
 Opera Glass

1866 births
1926 deaths
20th-century classical composers
20th-century male musicians
Alumni of Gonville and Caius College, Cambridge
Alumni of Selwyn College, Cambridge
Alumni of the Royal College of Music
Classical composers of church music
Fellows of Gonville and Caius College, Cambridge
Irish classical composers
Irish male classical composers
Irish organists
Male organists
Musicians from County Armagh
People from Armagh (city)
Pupils of Charles Villiers Stanford
String quartet composers
Professors of Music (Cambridge)
19th-century musicologists